This is a complete list of high schools in the U.S. state of Hawaii. There are four school districts on the island of Oahu: Honolulu District, Central Oahu District, Leeward Oahu and Windward Oahu.

Honolulu
In the Honolulu District are the following public high schools: Farrington, McKinley, Roosevelt, Kaimuki H, Anuenue E&H, Kalani H, and Kaiser H.

Public

 Farrington High School, Kalihi
 Kaimuki High School, Kaimukī
 Kaiser High School, Hawaii Kai
 Kalani High School, East Honolulu
 McKinley High School, Central Honolulu
 Moanalua High School, Moanalua/Salt Lake
 Radford High School, Aliamanu/Pearl Harbor
 Roosevelt High School, Makiki

Public charter

Myron B. Thompson Academy, Honolulu
Hawaii Technology Academy, Waipahu 
University Laboratory School, Honolulu

Private

ASSETS School
Christian Academy
Damien Memorial School
Hawaii Baptist Academy
Hawaiian Mission Academy
ʻIolani School
Kamehameha Schools
La Pietra (Hawaii School for Girls)
Le Jardin Academy
Maryknoll School
Mid-Pacific Institute
Pacific Buddhist Academy
Punahou School
Sacred Hearts Academy
St. Andrew's Priory School
Saint Louis School
Varsity International School
Waldorf Academy

Greater Oahu

Public

 Aiea High School, Aiea
 Campbell High School, Ewa Beach
 Castle High School, Kāneohe
 Kahuku High & Intermediate School, Kahuku
 Kailua High School, Kailua
 Kalāheo High School, Kailua
 Kapolei High School, Kapolei
 Leilehua High School, Wahiawā
 Mililani High School, Mililani
 Nānākuli High & Intermediate School, Nānākuli
 Olomana High & Intermediate School, Kailua
 Pearl City High School, Pearl City
 Waianae High School, Waianae
 Waialua High and Intermediate School, Waialua
 Waipahu High School, Waipahu

Private

Friendship Christian School, Ewa Beach
Hanalani Schools, Mililani
Island Pacific Academy, Kapolei
Lanakila Baptist High School, Ewa Beach
Le Jardin Academy, Kailua

Niihau
 Niihau High & Elementary School, Niihau

Kauai

Public

 Kapaa High School, Kapaa
 Kauai High School, Līhue
 Waimea High School, Waimea

Private

Island School, Līhue
Kahili Adventist School, Koloa

Molokai
 Molokai High School, Hoolehua

Lānai

Lanai High and Elementary School

Maui

Public

 Henry Perrine Baldwin High School, Wailuku
 Hāna High and Elementary School, Hana
 King Kekaulike High School, Pukalani
 Lahainaluna High School, Lahaina
 Maui High School, Kahului
 Kihei Charter School, Kihei

Private

Kamehameha Schools Maui Campus, Pukalani
Maui Preparatory Academy, Napili
St. Anthony High School, Wailuku
Seabury Hall College Preparatory School, Makawao
Ka'ahumanu Hou Christian School & Noah's Ark Preschool, Kahului

Big Island

Public

 Hilo High School, Hilo
 Honokaa High & Intermediate School, Honokaa
 Kaū High & Pāhala Elementary School, Pāhala
 Ke Kula o Ehunuikaimalino, Kealakekua (K-12)
 Keaau High School, Keaau
 Kealakehe High School, Kailua-Kona
 Kohala High School, Kapaau
 Konawaena High School, Kealakekua
 Laupāhoehoe Community Public Charter School, Laupahoehoe
 Pāhoa High & Intermediate, Pahoa
 Waiakea High School, Hilo

Public charter

Hawaii Academy of Arts and Sciences, Pāhoa
Ke Ana Laahana Charter School, Hilo
Ke Kula o Nāwahīokalaniōpuu, Keaau
Laupāhoehoe Community Public Charter School, Laupahoehoe
West Hawaii Explorations Academy Public Charter School, Kailua Kona

Private

Hawaiʻi Preparatory Academy (HPA), Kamuela
Hualalai Academy, Kailua Kona
Kamehameha Schools Hawaii Campus, Keaau
Makua Lani Christian Academy, Kailua Kona
Parker School, Kamuela
St. Joseph High School (Hilo, Hawaii), Hilo

See also
List of middle schools in Hawaii
List of elementary schools in Hawaii
Hawaii State Department of Education, sole centralized school district for the state

References

External links
List of Hawaii High Schools and Alumni from HomegrownHawaii.com
Official list of high school alumni sites in Hawaii from HawaiiAlumni.com
List of high schools in Hawaii from SchoolTree.org

Hawaii
High